The University of Antofagasta (also referred to as UA) is a public research university located in Antofagasta, Chile. It is a derivative university part of the Chilean Traditional Universities.

History
The university was formed in 1981 via the fusion of two regional campuses of the nationwide state universities Universidad de Chile and Universidad Tecnica del Estado.

The University was founded as an extension of the mining education imparted in the region since the nineteenth century.
Its objectives have been to create, promote and divulge the region's scientific, technological, cultural and artistical advancements.

External links 

 Official website 

Educational institutions established in 1981
Buildings and structures in Antofagasta
Antofagasta
Universities in Antofagasta Region
1981 establishments in Chile